The Catalonian national ice hockey team was the national ice hockey team of the Spanish autonomous community of Catalonia. They are controlled by the Catalan Federation of Winter Sports. The team last participated in an international game in 2016, a 4–3 win against Basque Country.

History
Catalonia played its first game in 2003 where they played an exhibition game against Belgium in Puigcerdà, Spain. Catalonia won the game 2–0. After a five-year absence Catalonia to international play when they competed in a one-game exhibition match against the Basque Country held in Vitoria-Gasteiz, Spain which Catalonia went on to win 5–3. The following year, Catalonia competed in a second exhibition game against Basque Country. Catalonia lost the match 1–9 and also lost their first game in international competition.

All-time record against other nations
As of 23 December 2016

References

Ice hockey teams in Catalonia
Former national ice hockey teams
Ice Hockey